Loha Assembly constituency is one of the 288 Vidhan Sabha (legislative assembly) constituencies of Maharashtra state, western India.Latur (Lok Sabha constituency). This constituency is located in Nanded district. The delimitation of the constituency happened in 2008.

Geographical scope
The constituency comprises parts of Loha taluka, Revenue Circles of Malakoli Kalambar, Kapsi
Budruk, Loha and Loha Municipal Council, parts of Kandhar taluka, Revenue Circles of Usman Nagar, Barul, Kandhar and Kandhar Municipal Council. 

Loha (Taluka) which is located 35 km from Nanded. Being on state highway this is very well connected for the transportation. It belongs to Marathwada region . It belongs to Aurangabad Division 

Loha Pin code is 431708 and postal head office is Loha .  oha is surrounded by Kandhar Taluka towards East , Palam Taluka towards west , Purna Taluka towards North , Nanded Taluka towards North .

Representatives
 1978: Gurunath Kurude, PWP
 1995: Rohidas Chavan, Shiv Sena
 1999: Rohidas Chavan, Shivsena
 2004: Prataprao Govindrao Chikhalikar
 2009: Shankarrao Ganeshrao Dhondge, NCP.
 2014: Prataprao Govindrao Chikhalikar, Shiv Sena.
 2019: Shyamsundar Dagdoji Shinde, PWP

References

Assembly constituencies of Maharashtra
Politics of Nanded district